Below is a list of the Lords of Chantilly including the name of the Château de Chantilly, for which the titles takes its name from.  Several families have been included as the owners of the land and the succession is given to the eldest son unless specified.

House of Bouteillers de Senlis (before 1221–1358)

House of Orgemont (1386-1484)

House of Montmorency (1484-1632)

House of Bourbon-Condé (1632-1830)

House of Orléans (1830–1897)

Footnotes

References

See also 

 Chantilly
 Domain of Chantilly
 Château de Chantilly

History of France
History of Oise
Chant
French noble titles